Non-vascular plants are plants without a vascular system consisting of xylem and phloem. Instead, they may possess simpler tissues that have specialized functions for the internal transport of water.

Non-vascular plants include two distantly related groups:
 Bryophytes, an informal group that taxonomists  treat as three separate land-plant divisions, namely: Bryophyta (mosses), Marchantiophyta (liverworts), and Anthocerotophyta (hornworts). In all bryophytes, the primary plants are the haploid gametophytes, with the only diploid portion being the attached sporophyte, consisting of a stalk and sporangium. Because these plants lack lignified water-conducting tissues, they cannot become as tall as most vascular plants.
 Algae, especially green algae. The algae consist of several unrelated groups. Only the groups included in the Viridiplantae are still considered relatives of land plants.

These groups are sometimes called "lower plants", referring to their status as the earliest plant groups to evolve, but the usage is imprecise since both groups are polyphyletic and may be used to include vascular cryptogams, such as the ferns and fern allies that reproduce using spores. Non-vascular plants are often among the first species to move into new and inhospitable territories, along with prokaryotes and protists, and thus function as pioneer species.

Non-vascular plants do not have a wide variety of specialized tissue types. Mosses and leafy liverworts have structures called phyllids that resemble leaves, but only consist of single sheets of cells with no internal air spaces, no cuticle or stomata, and no xylem or phloem. Consequently, phyllids are unable to control the rate of water loss from their tissues and are said to be poikilohydric. Some liverworts, such as Marchantia, have a cuticle, and the sporophytes of mosses have both cuticles and stomata, which were important in the evolution of land plants.

All land plants have a life cycle with an alternation of generations between a diploid sporophyte and a haploid gametophyte, but in all non-vascular land plants, gametophyte generation is dominant. In these plants, the sporophytes grow from and are dependent on gametophytes for taking in water and mineral nutrients and for provision of photosynthate, the products of photosynthesis.

References

Plants